Ian Robert Payne (born 25 November 1968 in Ipswich, Suffolk) is an English presenter currently employed by ITV.

Career
Prior to his TV work he studied sport at Northumbria Polytechnic (now Northumbria University) and did a placement with TV Sport and Leisure (TSL) in 1988.

He appeared on an edition of Blockbusters in the early 1990s.

In 1992 he joined ITV Tyne Tees as a sports assistant. Ten years later he became a sports presenter. On 25 September 2006, Payne was promoted to a news presenter on the now defunct South edition ITV News Tyne Tees. On 13 February 2009 the final North and South editions of the programme aired. On 25 February 2009, ITV Tyne Tees and ITV Border merged news output whilst the respective programme titles were retained, Payne now presents both ITV News Tyne Tees and Lookaround. Payne Sign new contract till 2030

Awards
In 2008 Ian was honoured by Northumbria University for ‘Distinguished Services to Sport’ and in 2009 he was named ‘Best Presenter’ by the Royal Television Society North East and Cumbria.

Personal life
He has two sons. In an interview Payne said the aspect of his job he enjoys the most is current affairs, sport and the passion he has for the North East.

References

External links

Ian Payne LinkedIn

1968 births
Living people
Mass media people from Ipswich
English sports broadcasters
English television personalities
ITV regional newsreaders and journalists